The Moral Basis of a Backward Society is a book by Edward C. Banfield, an American political scientist who visited Montegrano, Italy (Montegrano is the fictitious name used by Banfield to protect the original town of Chiaromonte, in the Southern Italian region of Basilicata) in 1955. He observed a self-interested, family-centric society, which sacrificed the public good for the sake of nepotism and the immediate family. As an American, Banfield was witnessing what was to become infamous as the Southern Italian Mafias and a self-centered clan-system promoting the well-being of their inner group at the expense of the other ones. Banfield postulated that the backwardness of such a society could be explained "largely but not entirely" by "the inability of the villagers to act together for their common good or, indeed, for any end transcending the immediate, material interest of the nuclear family."

Banfield concluded that Montegrano's plight was rooted in the distrust, envy, and suspicion displayed by its inhabitants' relations with one another. Fellow citizens would refuse to help one another unless their own personal material gain was at stake. Many attempted to hinder their neighbors from attaining success, believing that others' good fortune would inevitably harm their own interests. Montegrano's citizens viewed their village life as little more than a battleground. Consequently, there prevailed social isolation and poverty and an inability to work together to solve common social problems or even to pool common resources and talents to build infrastructure or common economic concerns.

Montegrano's inhabitants were not unique or inherently more impious than other people. However, for various reasons, historical and cultural, they did not have what he termed "social capital", the habits, norms, attitudes, and networks to motivate people to work for the common good.

This stress on the nuclear family over the interest of the citizenry, he called the ethos of "amoral familism". This, he argued, was probably created by the combination of certain land-tenure conditions, a high mortality rate, and the absence of other community building institutions.

See also
Organized crime in Italy
Social capital
Southern Italy

References

External links
Edward C. Banfield. 1958. Moral Basis of a Backward Society [Paperback].

1958 non-fiction books
American non-fiction books
Books about Italy